Mid Antrim may refer to:

 The central part of County Antrim
 Mid Antrim (Northern Ireland Parliament constituency)
 Mid Antrim (UK Parliament constituency)